Albert Stroni (born 18 November 1971) is an Albanian retired footballer who played as a striker.

Club career
Born in Fier, Stroni soon showed skills as a prolific striker in his homeland, playing for Dinamo Tirana and Apolonia Fier and being instrumental in the former side's double in the 1989–90 season.

In 1992, Stroni moved to FR Yugoslavia to play for FK Partizan but, after being vastly overlooked, he returned home to Dinamo Tirana. In the following summer he switched to Spain, where he would spend most of his remaining years as a footballer: he started with SD Compostela but, because of bureaucratic reasons, ended not playing a single league match for the club, after which he joined Galician neighbours CD Ourense also in the second division, where he also did not manage to appear officially.

Subsequently, Stroni signed with amateurs Club Lemos in the same autonomous community, eventually becoming one of the most important players in the club's history, averaging more than one goal every two games and first promoting them to the fourth level. After three seasons, he played one year with another amateur – and Galician – side, Ponte Ourense, and another in Gimnástica Segoviana CF.

Stroni would represent three teams in 2000–01, starting in Portugal with F.C. Maia then returning to Spain to play for Mérida UD and CD Don Benito. In the following campaign he signed with French team Angers SCO but, after a poor year, returned again to Spain and Lemos, for a further four years and another fourth-tier promotion (in his last season he acted as player-coach, and scored a total of 105 competitive goals in his two spells). The 35-year-old retired in 2007, after one season with another team in division four, CD Lalín.

After retiring, Stroni relocated in Ourense, where he opened a car stand. Shortly after, however, he accepted the offer to manage Lemos, who faced the possibility of folding.

International career
Stroni represented the Albania national team on 35 occasions, all categories counted. After appearing for the Albania U21 – during that team's trip to Spain, he fled and requested right of asylum – he went on to gain three caps for the senior side.

Honours

Club
Dinamo Tirana
Albanian Superliga: 1989–90
Albanian Cup: 1988–89, 1989–90
Albanian Supercup: 1989

Partizan
First League of FR Yugoslavia: 1992–93

Individual
Albanian Superliga: MVP 1990–91

References

External links

11v11 profile

1971 births
Living people
Sportspeople from Fier
Albanian footballers
Albania under-21 international footballers
Association football forwards
FK Dinamo Tirana players
KF Apolonia Fier players
FK Partizan players
SD Compostela footballers
CD Ourense footballers
F.C. Maia players
Mérida UD footballers
Angers SCO players
Kategoria Superiore players
Segunda División B players
Tercera División players
Championnat National players
Albanian expatriate footballers
Expatriate footballers in Serbia and Montenegro
Expatriate footballers in Spain
Expatriate footballers in Portugal
Expatriate footballers in France
Albanian expatriate sportspeople in Serbia
Albanian expatriate sportspeople in Spain
Albanian expatriate sportspeople in Portugal
Albanian expatriate sportspeople in France